Anke Huber was the defending champion, but lost in semifinals to Gabriela Sabatini.

Iva Majoli won the title, defeating Sabatini 6–4, 7–6(7–4) in the final.

Seeds

Draw

Finals

Top half

Bottom half

References
 Official Results Archive (ITF)
 Official Results Archive (WTA)

Porsche Tennis Grand Prix - Singles
1995 Singles